This is a list of women photographers who were born in Egypt or whose works are closely associated with that country.

B
Lara Baladi (born 1969), Egyptian-Lebanese photographer, multimedia artist

E
Laura El-Tantawy (born 1980), freelance news photographer, artistic photographer

H
Nermine Hammam (born 1967), graphic designer, visual artist, photographer

L
Huda Lutfi (born 1948), visual artist, cultural historian

-
Egyptian women photographers, List of
Photographers
Photographers